IROC XXVII'' was the 27th season of the Crown Royal International Race of Champions''', which began on Friday, February 14, 2003 at Daytona International Speedway. The roster included 12 drivers from five separate racing leagues. Mark Martin won the first race to tie an IROC record 11 career wins, tying him with Al Unser Jr. and Dale Earnhardt. Rookie Kurt Busch won in only his second start in race 2 after finishing second at Daytona. At Chicagoland, Mike Bliss became the first driver representing the Craftsman Truck Series to win a race in IROC competition. Jimmie Johnson won the final race of the year for his first career IROC victory. Kurt Busch clinched the title with his fourth-place showing in the race, as Mark Martin and Mike Bliss, his closest competitors, finished fifth and tenth, respectively.

The roster of drivers and final points standings were as follows: 



Race One (Daytona International Speedway)
 Mark Martin
 Kurt Busch
 Danny Lasoski
 Jimmie Johnson
 Greg Biffle
 Steve Kinser
 Kevin Harvick
 Sam Hornish Jr.
 Mike Bliss
 Felipe Giaffone
 Hélio Castroneves
 Ryan Newman

Race Two (Talladega Superspeedway)
 Kurt Busch
 Mike Bliss
 Greg Biffle
 Sam Hornish Jr.
 Mark Martin
 Kevin Harvick
 Ryan Newman
 Jimmie Johnson
 Steve Kinser
 Danny Lasoski
 Felipe Giaffone
 Hélio Castroneves

Race Three (Chicagoland Speedway)
 Mike Bliss
 Ryan Newman
 Kurt Busch
 Kevin Harvick
 Mark Martin
 Jimmie Johnson
 Sam Hornish Jr.
 Scott Sharp
 Danny Lasoski
 Hélio Castroneves
 Steve Kinser

Race Four (Indianapolis Motor Speedway)
 Jimmie Johnson
 Kevin Harvick
 Ryan Newman
 Kurt Busch
 Mark Martin
 Steve Kinser
 Greg Biffle
 Hélio Castroneves
 Steve Kinser
 Mike Bliss
 Sam Hornish Jr.
 Danny Lasoski

References

International Race of Champions
2003 in American motorsport